Walking With is the sixth solo studio album by South Korean pop singer-songwriter Kim Dong-ryool, and his seventh solo album overall. It was released on October 1, 2014 by the artist's label Music Farm and distributed by LOEN Entertainment. Guitarist Lee Sang-soon (who has also been known as Lee Hyori's husband) and Superstar K2 runner-up John Park participated on the album as featured artists. The album is the singer's first solo release since the holiday album KimdongrYULE (2011), and also his first studio album since Monologue (2008).

The self-produced album features ten tracks in total, including the lead single "How I Am" and the track under the same title. Without any televised promotions, "How I Am" topped the Gaon Singles Chart for two consecutive weeks. The song also won Song of the Year at the 4th annual Gaon Chart K-Pop Awards.

An LP edition of the album, limited to 3,000 copies, was available for sale.

Singles

"How I Am"
"How I Am" is the lead single from the album. The song depicts a man who misses his past lover, and actor Gong Yoo starred in its corresponding music video. After filming the music video, Gong stated "I can't forget the memories when I listened to the music of Exhibition using cassette tapes in my school years. Kim has been my favorite musician since then. I wanted to celebrate by starring in the music video, in my mind to cheer the 20th anniversary of his debut." The music video was released on October 1, 2014, via LOEN Entertainment's official YouTube channel.

Upon its release, "How I Am" achieved an "all-kill" status in South Korea, reaching the pole position on all of the real-time music charts including MelOn, Bugs, Soribada, Genie, Mnet Music, Monkey3, Olleh Music, Cyworld Music, Daum Music, and Naver Music. Without any broadcast promotions, the song topped the Gaon Singles Chart for two consecutive weeks. It also won the first place on televised K-pop music shows like The Music Trend (SBS) and Music Bank (KBS), from October 12 to 17, 2014. This was Kim's first feat since he received a trophy for "Should I Tell You Again That I Love You?" on MBC's Music Camp (currently Show! Music Core) in January 2002.

"How I Am" was the 51st biggest selling digital song of 2014 in South Korea. Since its release, the song has sold about 900,000 digital copies domestically.

Promotion
Instead of having broadcast promotions, it was announced that Kim would hold his nationwide concert tour from November 1, 2014. Starting in Busan, he performed in cities including Seongnam, Gwangju, Goyang, Jeonju, Seoul, Daegu, and Daejeon until January 3, 2015, to promote his comeback album.

Track listing
All songs written and composed by Kim Dong-ryool.

Notes
 The title of track 2 literally means "The Youth".
 The title of track 5 literally means "That's How I Am".
 The title of track 7 literally means "My Heart Is".

Chart performance

Album charts

Single charts
How I Am

Other charted songs

Awards and nominations

Annual music awards

Music program awards

Release history

See also
 List of number-one hits of 2014 (South Korea)

Footnotes

References

External links
 
 
 
 Kim Dong-ryool's official website

2014 albums
Kim Dong-ryool albums
Korean-language albums
Kakao M albums